The Arta Industrial Group is a multinational conglomerate company headquartered in Tehran, Iran. In terms of market capitalization and revenues, Arta Group is one of the largest private corporate group in Iran.

The Arta Group has operations in more than 5 countries and its companies export products and services to 30 nations. The Arta Group comprises 12 companies and subsidiaries in six business sectors. The group takes the name from old name of the city called Arta ville.

History

He established Arta Moquette in 1980 as the first producer of needle nonwoven carpets in Iran. As sales grew they invested in fiber with company name Arta Aliaf in 1982 becoming the first manufacturer in the carpet industry to produce their own fiber. Arta Moquette and Arta Aliaf are located in the city called Ardebil in Iran.

Sparked by continued growth, Arta diversified into tufting carpet in 1990, establishing a factory known today as Arta Tuft in a new plant near the city called Takestan, Qazvin, Iran. Arta Industrial group invested in Yarn extrusion in 1991 to produce the raw material for tufting carpet and the need in huge market of rug industry in Iran with the company name Arta Tech. In 1992, Arta Tech's extrusion capacity was greatly increased with the addition of modern machines. This modern facility gives Arta the ability to produce different types of Yarns. In 1995, Arta continued its vertical integration with the addition of yet another new facility in Takestan plant for the carpet and fiber in different types and sizes with high capacity.

The expansion in yarn and fiber capacity is being driven by the growth of the carpet and rug manufacturing.
From the first carpet manufactured in 1980 in Ardebil to the Takestan plant, through the establishment of Arta Industrial Group has rapidly grown into the Iran's first largest carpet and textile raw materials producer.

Arta Moquette also looks outside the Iran borders for growth opportunities. From 1998, Arta Industrial Group got numerous awards for being best exporter and best investor in Iran.

In 2002, Arta Industrial Group decided to invest on hard flooring industries. Arta invested on energy, wood, plastics and printing for packaging in a first private industrial zone in Iran owned by Arta Group until now. Arta Group decided to invest in automobile industry due to high demand in Iranian market.

Textile industries

 Non woven Carpet
 Tufted Carpet
 Carpet
 Yarn
 Fiber
 Latex

Energy 

 Arta Energy is the first private sector power company who invested on wind power mills. It supplies power to government central electric network.

Wood industries 

  Arta Pan is a manufacturer of wood-based panels like high density fiberboard, medium-density fibreboard (MDF), low density fiberboard and associated products. Arta Pan makes products for the furniture, construction, distribution and industries at its production facility in Ardebil, Iran.
  Arta Clic is a producer of laminate flooring in Iran and Middle East region.
  Arta Decor is a decor paper impregnation manufacturer in Iran. Since its foundation 2001, Arta Decor has undergone extremely growth in impregnated decor paper.  The company, which operates production location in Ardabil, Iran, supplies impregnated decor paper to wood industry in other countries, where it is mainly used for the surface embellishment of residential and kitchen furniture and laminate flooring.

Packaging industries 

 Arta Plast is a producer of value-added blown film and flexible packaging products.

Electronics industries 
Arta Electronics started the business in the assembling line to produce TV, LCD TV, with the brand (marshal) in Iran. The company invested in the other assembling lines to produce cell phones for some Iranian with Japanese parts and technology.

Petrochemical industries 

 Arta Energy is a producer of petrochemical materials ( methanol, formaldehyde, resins )

Automobile industries 

Arta Tech Motor is the exclusive Importer of Maserati in Iran. 
Italian luxury sports car maker Maserati appointed Arta Tech Motor as a first importer of the brand in Iran's history. Arta Tech Motor is completely owned by Arta Industrial Group.

Targets 
Invest on new 1200 cubic meter MDF production line in 2015.
Invest on 100MW natural gas power plant in Ardabil.

Manufacturing companies based in Tehran
Maserati